The Israel Prize (pras israél) is an award bestowed by the State of Israel, and regarded as the state's highest cultural honor.

History
The Israel Prize is awarded annually, on Israeli Independence Day, in a state ceremony in Jerusalem, in the presence of the President, the Prime Minister, the Speaker of the Knesset (Israel's legislature), and the Supreme Court President. The prize was established in 1953 at the initiative of the Minister of Education Ben-Zion Dinor, who himself went on to win the prize in 1958 and 1973.

Awarding the prize
The prize is awarded in the following four areas, with the precise subfields changing from year to year in a cycle of 4 to 7 years, except for the last area, which is awarded annually:
 the humanities, social sciences, and Jewish studies
 life and exact sciences
 culture, arts, communication and sports
 lifetime achievement and exceptional contribution to the nation (since 1972)

The recipients of the prize are Israeli citizens or organizations who have displayed excellence in their field(s) or have contributed strongly to Israeli culture. The winners are selected by committees of judges, who pass on their recommendations to the Minister of Education. Prize winners are elected by ad-hoc committees, appointed by the minister of education for each category each year. The decisions of the committee must be unanimous. The prize money was NIS 75,000 as of 2008.

Recipients

Prominent winners include Shmuel Yosef Agnon, Martin Buber, Abba Eban, A. B. Yehoshua, Israel Aumann, Golda Meir, Amos Oz, Ephraim Kishon, Naomi Shemer, David Benvenisti, Leah Goldberg (posthumously) and Teddy Kollek, and organizations such as Israel Philharmonic Orchestra, Jewish Agency, Yad Vashem and Jewish National Fund. Though the prize is generally awarded to Israeli citizens only, in exceptional cases it can be awarded to non-Israelis who have held Israeli residency for many years. Zubin Mehta received a special award of the Israel Prize in 1991. Mehta is originally from India and was music advisor and later the music director of the Israel Philharmonic Orchestra for 50 years until his retirement in 2019.

Controversy
The decision to award the prize to specific individuals has sometimes led to impassioned political debate. In 1993, the opposition of then Prime Minister Yitzhak Rabin to the nomination of Yeshayahu Leibowitz led Leibowitz to decline the prize. In 2004, Education and Culture Minister Limor Livnat, sent the decision to award the prize to the sculptor Yigal Tumarkin back to the prize committee. The decision was brought before the Supreme Court of Israel in the case of publicist Shmuel Shnitzer, politician Shulamit Aloni, professor Zeev Sternhell and Maccabi Tel Aviv basketball club chairman Shimon Mizrahi.

In February 2015, Prime Minister Benyamin Netanyahu vetoed the appointment of two members of the selection panel for the Israel Prize in Literature, prompting the other three members, including Ziva Ben-Porat, to resign in protest. Netanyahu explained that "[t]oo often, it seemed that the extreme panel members were bestowing the prizes on their friends". One of the prize candidates  Yigal Schwartz of Ben-Gurion University of the Negev withdrew his nomination and called on other candidates to do the same. Over the next few days, members of the committees for the literary research and film prizes also resigned, leaving only two members of the original 13, and many other candidates withdrew their nominations. David Grossman withdrew his candidature saying that "Netanyahu's move is a cynical and destructive ploy that violates the freedom of spirit, thought and creativity of Israel and I refuse to cooperate with it".

In August 2021 the Supreme Court of Israel unanimously overturned a decision in June by former Education Minister Yoav Gallant to overrule the award of the Israel Prize in mathematics and computer science to Oded Goldreich because of Goldreich's stated views on the occupied territories. Attorney General Avichai Mendelblit had refused to defend in court Gallant's withholding of the prize, which Mendelblit said "deviated from the range of reasonableness and was not legal." The court's majority opinion ruled that Yifat Shasha-Biton, Gallant's successor as Education Minister, should decide whether to award the prize to Goldreich, while a minority opinion called for Goldreich to receive it without further review. In November 2021, Shasha-Biton announced that she would block Goldreich from receiving the prize. In an editorial, the Jerusalem Post wrote that Goldreich's "[c]alling for the boycott of professional colleagues... is a red line that shouldn't be crossed". A Haaretz editorial said that Shasha-Biton's decision meant "the most prestigious prize awarded by Israel will not be the mark of scientific excellence but of loyalty to the government".

In popular culture
In the film Footnote, father and son scholars compete for the Israel prize, straining their already complex relationship.

Venue
International Convention Center
Jerusalem Theatre

Hosts

References

Further reading
 Barak, Or (2018). The Israel Prize: Politics Behind Glory. 2018 (in Hebrew).

External links
 
 
October, 2006: Ariel Sharon's disputable nomination for Israel Prize - From Ariel Sharon' Life Story, biography (in English)

 
Israeli culture
Awards established in 1953
Israeli awards
Israeli literary awards
1953 establishments in Israel